Peter Holland may refer to:

Peter Holland (broadcaster) (born 1947), Australian broadcaster and academic
Peter Holland (cricketer) (born 1958), New Zealand cricketer
Peter Holland (ice hockey) (born 1991), Canadian ice hockey player
Peter R. Holland, English physicist
Peter Holland (zoologist) (born 1963), British zoologist